Nowe Jeżewo  is a village in the administrative district of Gmina Tykocin within Białystok County, Podlaskie Voivodeship in north-eastern Poland.

The village has a population of 100.

References

Villages in Białystok County